The 1999 Island Games on the island of Gotland was the 6th edition in which a men's football (soccer) tournament was played at the multi-games competition. It was contested by 14 teams.

Ynys Môn won the tournament for the first time.

Participants

 Isle of Man

Group Phase

Group 1

Group 2

Group 3

Group 4

Placement play-off matches

13th place match

9th – 12th place semi-finals

5th – 8th place semi-finals

11th place match

9th place match

7th place match

5th place match

Final stage

Semi-finals

3rd place match

Final

Final rankings

Top goalscorers

9 goals
  Peter Langridge

6 goals
 Dent*

5 goals
 Molin*
 Plenty*
 Måsoval*

4 goals
 F.Larsson*
 Gartland*

3 goals
 Raggett*
 Brodie
 Barsdell*

* May have scored more

External links
Official 1999 website

1999
Island
1999
Sport in Gotland County
Gibraltar in international football
Island